Polaroids: A Greatest Hits Collection is a compilation album by American singer-songwriter and musician Shawn Colvin, released in 2004. The cover song, "I'll Be Back" by The Beatles, is unique to this collection.

Track listing
All tracks composed by Shawn Colvin and John Leventhal; except where indicated
"Steady On" – 4:56
"Diamond in the Rough" – 5:00
"Shotgun Down the Avalanche" – 5:01
"Round of Blues" (Colvin, Larry Klein) – 4:43
"Polaroids" (Colvin) – 5:49
"I Don't Know Why" (Colvin) – 4:37
"Every Little Thing (He) Does Is Magic" (Sting) – 3:17
"This Must Be the Place (Naïve Melody)" (David Byrne, Chris Frantz, Jerry Harrison, Tina Weymouth) – 4:02
"Sunny Came Home" – 4:25
"You and the Mona Lisa" – 4:06
"Get Out of This House" – 4:16
"The Facts About Jimmy" – 5:24
"Whole New You" – 4:02
"A Matter of Minutes" – 5:08
"I'll Be Back" (John Lennon, Paul McCartney) – 3:41

References

Shawn Colvin albums
Albums produced by John Leventhal
2004 greatest hits albums
Columbia Records compilation albums